The Journal of Broadcasting & Electronic Media is a quarterly peer-reviewed academic journal covering media studies, with a specific focus on broadcasting and electronic media. It was established in 1957 as the Journal of Broadcasting, obtaining its current name in 1985. The editor-in-chief is Carolyn A. Lin. According to the Journal Citation Reports, the journal has a 2017 impact factor of 1.917 and a five-year impact factor of 2.885.

References

External links

Media studies journals
Quarterly journals
Routledge academic journals
Publications established in 1957
English-language journals